Scott Douglas MacIntyre (born June 22, 1985) is an American singer, songwriter, and pianist, and the eighth place finalist on the eighth season of American Idol. MacIntyre is visually impaired, and while not completely blind, he has tunnel vision and has only a two-percent field of vision, both due to Leber's congenital amaurosis.

Early life
MacIntyre was born in Redondo Beach, California to Douglas R. and Carole C. (Williams) MacIntyre and has a younger brother, Todd (born 1988) and a younger sister, Katelyn (born 1991). MacIntyre started playing the piano by ear when he was three years old. He was taught by a neighborhood piano teacher near their home in Redondo Beach, California. At six years of age, he began training in classical music. When Scott turned 10, the family moved to Toronto, Ontario, Canada. They lived there for four years, and in that time Scott studied at the Royal Conservatory of Music. The MacIntyre family then relocated to Arizona and Scott studied under Walter Cosand, a university professor of Arizona State University. He was home-schooled until the age of 14, when he was admitted into Arizona State University's Barrett Honors College and Herberger College of the Arts. Scott won the 2004 Arizona Young Artists Competition at Herberger Theater in the vocal division. In 2005, USA Today named him one of its twenty College Academic All-Stars. In 2005, MacIntyre performed as a guest soloist with the Phoenix Symphony. The same year, MacIntyre was diagnosed with kidney disease and in November 2006, he had to spend ten months undergoing dialysis, severely hampering his capacity to perform and travel. In 2007 on August 22, Walter Cosand's wife Patricia donated her kidney to MacIntyre, which saved his life. He graduated from ASU in 2005, and he was received in the White House by Laura Bush as one of the RFB&D (Recording for the Blind and Dyslexic) scholarship winners in 2006. He obtained his master's degree at Royal Holloway, University of London and the Royal College of Music, where he studied on a Marshall Scholarship, one of the most competitive scholarships in the United States, awarded to only 40 American students each year.

After his successful run on American Idol, he began dating childhood friend Christina Teich at the end of 2009. In February 2011, the two announced their engagement in People magazine and were married on August 18, 2011, in Scottsdale, Arizona.

American Idol

Overview
MacIntyre auditioned for the eighth season of American Idol in Phoenix, Arizona. He is the first visually impaired finalist on the show. MacIntyre was eliminated on April 8, 2009, and came in eighth place.  MacIntyre was scheduled to perform during the Season 8 Finale with special guest Billy Joel, but the performance was scrapped after Joel unexpectedly cancelled. He performed on the American Idols LIVE! Tour 2009 featuring the Top 10 finalists.

Performances and results

 MacIntyre was saved first from elimination.

Career
MacIntyre released many albums before becoming a finalist of American Idol. He produced his first CD when he was eleven, and he has recorded five more CDs since then. The first three CDs were classical. The fourth was a Christian pop-rock CD titled "My Guarantee". The fifth CD was recorded with his family. In 2000, at the age of 15, he made his orchestral debut as he performed with the Phoenix Symphony as a guest piano soloist. In 2002 he competed in, and won, the Butterfield Young Artist Competition at ASU. He won the VSA Arts 2008 Young Soloists Award. Scott MacIntyre also plays guitar, drums, percussion, and bass on all of his brother Todd's songs. He released a post-Idol Christmas EP "Christmas Angel" to iTunes in 2009.

His first full-length post-Idol album, Heartstrings was released on March 11, 2010, to MacIntyre's web site and to digital retailers. Scott performed on American Idol on March 11 to promote his album. The album sold 1,000 copies a week after its release. This album was re-released in 2012 with new original bonus tracks including "I Am Hope" and "Bottom of the Well."

In April 2012 Scott released his first book, By Faith, Not By Sight, with Nashville-based publisher Thomas Nelson. The memoir chronicles the challenges of growing up blind, learning to play the piano, and dealing with an unexpected illness that almost took his life before he ever competed on the popular reality show. The book is available on Amazon, Walmart, and Barnes and Noble.

In August 2013 Scott launched a Kickstarter campaign that raised almost 40k for a new album that will drop in 2014.

In November 2013 Scott released his first full-length Christmas album, Christmas in Paris. The album features twelve tracks including ten arrangements of traditional holiday songs and two original songs, "Christmas Angel," written by MacIntyre and "Christmas in Paris," written by MacIntyre, Aaron Steenhoven and Ryan Hydro.

In November 2014, seven years after his first kidney transplant, MacIntyre announced that he is again experiencing kidney failure.  He presently has 18% kidney function, is on the waiting list for a transplant from a deceased donor, and will face dialysis unless a live donor can be found.  He released his new inspirational album Lighthouse.

Discography

Classical albums
1997 – Seeing Through Sound at Eleven
1999 – Brothers for all Seasons
2000 – Grand Classics

Pop albums
2003 – My Guarantee
2006 – Somewhere Else
2010 – Heartstrings
2012 – Heartstrings w/ bonus tracks 
2013 – Christmas in Paris
2014 – Lighthouse
2021 – Enduring Hope

Collaborations
2005 – MacIntyre Family Singers (with the MacIntyre family)
2008 – Ripped (with brother Todd in the band "The Glutes")

EPs
2009 – View From Above
2009 – Christmas Angel
2017 – Hope Is Rising

Singles
2011 – I Wanna Be There
2016 – Emmanuel
2018 – Look Up!

Awards and nominations

References

External links

Scott MacIntyre – Season 8 Contestants at the American Idol website (owned by Fox Interactive Media)
Scott Douglas MacIntyre Official Website
The Glutes Scott and Todd's band

American expatriates in Canada
21st-century American pianists
20th-century American singers
21st-century American singers
American Idol participants
American pop keyboardists
American male singer-songwriters
American multi-instrumentalists
Arizona State University alumni
Blind musicians
Marshall Scholars
Musicians from Scottsdale, Arizona
The Royal Conservatory of Music alumni
1985 births
Living people
Musicians from Redondo Beach, California
Alumni of the University of London
Alumni of the Royal College of Music
Singer-songwriters from California
20th-century American guitarists
21st-century American guitarists
20th-century American pianists
Guitarists from Arizona
Guitarists from California
American male pianists
American male guitarists
20th-century American male singers
21st-century American male singers
Singer-songwriters from Arizona